HMS Challenger was a second-class protected cruiser of the  of the Royal Navy.

Construction
Challenger was designed by Sir William Henry White, Director of Naval Construction, and was built at the Chatham Dockyard, where she was laid down on 1 December 1900. She was launched there on 27 May 1902, when she was named by Eva Holland, wife of Rear-Admiral S. C. Holland, Admiral-Superintendent of Chatham Dockyard.

Her machinery was made by the Wallsend Slipway & Engineering Company, and there were 12 boilers of the Babcock & Wilcox type.

Service history

Challenger was commissioned on 30 May 1904, and commenced duty on the Australia Station. She was paid off into reserve on 10 October 1912 before recommissioning during the First World War. She initially served as part of the Ninth Cruiser Squadron off West Africa before serving in East African waters. She was sold in 1920 and was broken up for scrap.

Notes

References
 Bastock, John (1988), Ships on the Australia Station, Child & Associates Publishing Pty Ltd; Frenchs Forest, Australia.

External links

 

Challenger-class cruisers of the Royal Navy
Ships built in Chatham
1902 ships
World War I cruisers of the United Kingdom